The 1968 Inter-Cities Fairs Cup Final was the final of the tenth season of the Inter-Cities Fairs Cup. It was played on 7 August and 11 September 1968 between Leeds United A.F.C. of England and Ferencváros of Hungary. Leeds United won the tie 1–0 on aggregate, having won the first leg 1–0 at home prior to a 0–0 draw in the second leg. It was both clubs' second appearance in the final, with Leeds United having been defeated finalists to Dinamo Zagreb in the previous season's final, whilst Ferencváros won the tournament in 1965 having beat Juventus in the final.

Route to the final 

The Inter-Cities Fairs Cup was created in 1955 as a tournament between cities that hosted international trade fairs. It originally had an irregular format with the competition taking place over multiple seasons, before the format was changed such that it took place over a single season. The 1967–68 Inter-Cities Fairs Cup was the 10th season of the competition.

Both teams took part in five rounds prior to reaching the final. The first leg saw Leeds beat Luxembourgish side Spora Luxembourg 16–0 over two legs before victories over FK Partizan, Hibernian and Rangers saw Leeds set up a semi-final against Scottish side Dundee. The first leg saw Leeds draw 1–1, before an Eddie Gray goal late in the second leg saw Leeds seal their place in the final. Despite losing 3–1 to Romanian side Argeș Pitești in the first leg of their first round tie, Ferencváros won the second leg 4–0 to advance to the next round. The second round saw Ferencváros come from behind to beat Real Zaragoza, before victories over Liverpool, Athletic Bilbao and Bologna saw the Hungarian side reach the final.

Match

First leg 
The attendance for the first leg, hosted at Leeds United's Elland Road, was just 25,268, with the match being televised live on BBC One cited as the reason for the surprisingly low figure. The referee for the first leg was Swiss referee Rudolf Scheurer. Both sides had early chances, with Ferencváros midfielder István Szőke failing to capitalise on a mistake made at the back by Leeds' Jack Charlton, before Leeds' Peter Lorimer had a shot well saved after goalkeeper István Géczi's free kick fell straight to Mick Jones. Leeds scored the first and only goal of the game in the 41st minute as Lorimer's corner fell first to Jack Charlton before Mick Jones bundled the ball over the line, despite complaints from the Hungarian side that Charlton fouled goalkeeper István Géczi in the build-up. The second half saw both teams have chances to score, though the away side had the best chances, with István Szőke putting a good chance wide before Gyula Rákosi failed to beat Leeds goalkeeper Gary Sprake.

Second leg 
The second leg, hosted in front of a crowd of 76,000 at Ferencváros' Népstadion, was under threat of not taking place due to growing tensions between the east and west as a result of the Warsaw Pact invasion of Czechoslovakia. The second leg saw Leeds play much more defensively than in the first, with Leeds described as having a 'ten-man defence'. Ferencváros dominated, with strong first-half chances falling to Gyula Rákosi and István Szőke, and their dominance continued throughout the match but they failed to score. Following the match, Leeds manager Don Revie stated, "As the final whistle drew nearer every minute seemed like an hour." Victory over Ferencváros marked Leeds' first major European honour.

Leeds United win 1–0 on aggregate

See also 
 1967–68 Inter-Cities Fairs Cup
 Ferencvárosi TC in European football
 Leeds United F.C. in European football

References 

 RSSSF

2
International club association football competitions hosted by Hungary
International club association football competitions hosted by England
Inter-Cities Fairs Cup Final 1968
Inter-Cities Fairs Cup Final 1968
1968
Inter
Inter
International sports competitions in Budapest
1960s in Budapest
Inter-Cities Fairs Cup Final
Inter-Cities Fairs Cup Final
1960s in Leeds
Sports competitions in Leeds